"Five Candles (You Were There)" is a song written and performed by Jars of Clay. It is the second radio single from their 1997 studio album Much Afraid. The song was initially written for the soundtrack to the motion picture Liar Liar, starring Jim Carrey. However, the ending credits, when the song would have been played, were changed to an outtakes and bloopers reel, thus cutting the song from the film. A working title of the song during the writing and recording studio sessions was "The Wish", which fits in with the themes of Liar Liar, just as the eventual title, "Five Candles", as the story of the film revolves around the wish Max made as he blew out the five candles for his fifth birthday. The song was later used in the 1998 Michael Keaton film, Jack Frost, and was featured on that film's soundtrack.

Track listing
Written by Dan Haseltine, Charlie Lowell, Stephen Mason, Matt Odmark
"Five Candles (You Were There)" (Radio Edit) – 3:38
"Five Candles (You Were There)" (Album Version) – 3:48

Performance credits
Dan Haseltine - vocals, percussion
Charlie Lowell - keyboards, piano, organ, background vocals
Stephen Mason - guitars, bass, background vocals
Matt Odmark - guitars, mandolin, background vocals
Neil Conti - drums

Technical credits
Stephen Lipson - producer
Robert Beeson - executive producer
Heff Moraes - engineering, mixing
Chuck Linder - recording
Mike Griffith - engineering
Adam Hatley - engineering assistant
Stephen Marcussen - mastering
Don C. Tyler - digital editing

External links
Official music video on YouTube

1997 singles
Jars of Clay songs
Song recordings produced by Stephen Lipson
Songs written by Dan Haseltine
Songs written by Charlie Lowell
Songs written by Stephen Mason (musician)
Songs written by Matt Odmark
1997 songs
Essential Records (Christian) singles